Veyil is a 2022 Indian Malayalam-language drama film written and directed by Sarath Menon. It is produced by Joby George under the banner of Goodwill Entertainments. The film stars Shane Nigam and Shine Tom Chacko.

Veyil marks Sarath's directorial debut. The music is composed by Pradeep Kumar, while Shaz Mohammed completed the cinematography and Praveen Prabhakar has done the editing. The film was released on 25 February 2022, having been postponed from the initial release on 28 January 2022.

Plot
Sidharth / Sidhu is a wayward youth living with his studious elder brother Karthi and their mother. Sidhu is poor in his academics and only interested in roaming around with his friend. He comes across Sruthy who is the classmate of his friend’s girlfriend and eventually both fall for each other. Sidhu gets into all sorts of troubles including beating up a guy who was trying to woo Sruthy and spreading rumors about her and lands up in police station eventually from where his mother must get him out. Sruthy' s two uncles Baby and Jomy run a money lending business in the city and Baby the elder one is trying to be a candidate for the municipal elections in the area but gets rejected in favor of the late councilor’s son since there are many allegations of forced interest extortions from their finance firm. At some point, Sidhu realizes that his brother Karthi also silently loves Sruthy and is heartbroken at the affair of him with her. He starts avoiding Sruthy and eventually the two break up with Sruthy deciding to move back to Dubai to her parents. At the same time Jomy warns Sidhu to back off from the relationship to which he agrees since he had already decided about it.

Karthi gets admission in a medical college after the entrance exams while Sidhu flunks his 12th papers. Their mother books a flat in the city with her life savings but gets swindled by the real estate company when they change her booking to a flat with a lesser value and refuses to refund her. Knowing this Sidhu goes to the company office and creates a ruckus for which police eventually arrest him. Jomy bails him out with the hidden objective of utilizing his as their local muscle. He entrusts Sudhi and another goon Jins to beat up the Councilor candidate. They break his legs when he is at the movie theatre restroom and later Jins files a false sexual assault case against him. They then help Sidhu in return to get back his mother’s money from the real estate company which makes his mother happy but suspicious at the same time of the type of people his son is hanging out with. Sidhu progresses as a routine muscle guy to Jomy and joins Chimban, another one of their henchmen in regularly harassing an autistic Kuttan and his mother to vacate their house which belongs to Baby’s father. Karthi knows Kuttan from a young age when they were neighbors in the past and cares for him. Once, after visiting Karthi in his hostel, Sidhu has Jomy roughen up Karthi’s seniors in a bar since they had ragged him in the hostel. Karthi and Sidhu get into an argument over this I the house and when their mother intervenes, Sidhu walks out of the house. Sruthy comes back from Dubai and meet with Sidhu when he goes to the railway station to pick her family. She advises him not to waste his time as a henchman to her uncles and lead a good life. As time passes, Sidhu’s mother talks about their past to Karthi and regrets not being able to bring up Sidhu well since she was always busy with the medications of the chronically sick Karthi. Karthi eventually reaches out to Sidhu and the two have an emotional reconciliation and both return to their mother. The trio spend a lot of time together outside with Sidhu’s friend.

Tired by Baby’s gang’s abuse for vacating the house, Kuttan’s mother commits suicide by jumping in front of a train. When Sidhu hears of this, he rushes to the police station for Kuttan but learns that someone had already taken him away confirming that he is mentally retarded and not behind his mother’s death. Sidhu stops hanging out with Jomy’s gang and one day Chimban tries to provoke Sidhu telling him the same. They get into a fight and Sidhu injures Chimban severely leading to Chimban getting hospitalized.  Sidhu storms into Baby’s house for an explanation, but Baby just warns him away telling that he already knew of Sudhi’s affair with Sruthy and not to get involved in her life away. On the way back he meets Jomy who also assures him there will be no further trouble from their gang. When Sidhu gets back home, he finds Karthi is not there and goes out again in search of him. Karthi was the one who was protecting Kuttan by giving him food and he had gone to Kuttan’s house that night to check on him wearing Sidhu’s baseball cap gifted by him. In the night, the mentally deranged Kuttan mistakes Karthi to be Sidhu by the Cap and kills him in a fit of rage in retaliation for harassing him and his mother. Sidhu eventually finds Karthi’s body and breaks down. The movie closes after some years when Kuttan gets released from jail and a now reformed Sidhu coming to meet him and hugging him.

Cast
Shane Nigam as Sidharth/Sid
Shine Tom Chacko as Jomy Mathew
Sreerekhaa as Radha
Sona Olickal as Sruthy
James Elia as Baby Mathew
Merin Jose Pottackal as Merin 
Saed Imran as Karthik/Karthi
Anandhu PM as Chimban
Bitto Davis as Famous Francis
Sudhi Koppa

Soundtrack
The music for the film is being composed by Pradeep Kumar with lyrics for the songs written by Vinayak Sasikumar and Anwar Ali. Renganaath Ravee is in charge of sound design.

Accolades

Release
The film was initially scheduled to release on 28 January 2022, but was postponed due to Covid-19. The film was released on 25 February 2022 after many postponements.

Reception
Veyil received positive reviews from critics. Deepa Soman of Times of India gave a rating of 3.5/5 and wrote "A relatable family drama". OTTplay gave a rating of 3.5/5 and wrote "Shane Nigam revels in Sarath Menon's stellar family drama about the prism of perspectives". The News Minute gave 3/5 and wrote "This Shane Nigam film is well-made, just a tad confusing". The Cinema Express wrote that "Broken bonds are repaired in this deeply affecting family drama".

References

External links
 

2022 films
2022 drama films
2020s Malayalam-language films
Indian drama films